The PlaceNigde Poetry Festival is moveable poetry festival that has been established in May 2012. It takes place in Tomsk. The motto of the festival is "A place for poetry is everywhere and nowhere".  This festival was founded in an attempt to renew an old form of poetry reading. Organizers deliberately refused the academic presentation the poetry. The idea of PlaceNigde was that the people should be involved in the "show" and spontaneously discover the poetic strings, deeply hidden inside of the mind.

References 
Novosti, Ria."The press" Retrieved 5 September 2012.

PLACENIGDE-2014 "The film" Retrieved 14 February 2014.

Arts festivals in Russia
Poetry festivals in Russia